Number 8 Squadron (sometimes written as No. VIII Squadron) of the Royal Air Force last operated the Boeing E-3D Sentry AEW1 (AWACS) from RAF Waddington, Lincolnshire. As of 2020, the RAF AWACS fleet was made up of three Sentry AEW1s, down from seven originally ordered in the late 1980s. Pursuant to the 2021 defence review, the E-3D Sentry aircraft made its final flight in U.K. service in August 2021.

It was announced in July 2019 that from the early 2020s the squadron will be the first to operate the Boeing E-7 Wedgetail AEW1, the planned replacement for the RAF's E-3D Sentry fleet. The squadron will then reform at RAF Lossiemouth.

History

First World War
As No. 8 Squadron of the Royal Flying Corps (RFC) it was formed at Brooklands, Surrey on 1 January 1915, equipped with the Royal Aircraft Factory B.E.2c. The squadron moved to Gosport later in January for further training, and crossed to France on 15 April 1915. While its main equipment was the B.E.2c, it also operated a fighter flight between May 1915 and early 1916 equipped with a mixture of aircraft, including the Royal Aircraft Factory B.E.8 and the Bristol Scout, while it also evaluated the prototype Royal Aircraft Factory B.E.9, a modified B.E.2 that carried the observer/gunner in a nacelle ahead of the aircraft's propeller.

Operating from airfields near Saint-Omer, the squadron was initially used for bombing and long-range reconnaissance, carrying out flights of up to  behind the front lines. In February 1916 it moved to Bellevue and specialised in the Corps Reconnaissance role, carrying out contact patrols and artillery spotting in close co-operation with the army. The squadron flew in support of the Battle of the Somme in the summer of 1916 and the Battle of Arras in April–May 1917. It received the improved B.E.2e from February 1917, but despite this, losses were heavy as all marks of B.E.2 were outclassed. Armstrong Whitworth FK.8s replaced the B.E.2s in August 1917.

In June 1918, No 8 Squadron, part of the Royal Air Force since 1 April 1918 and commanded by Major T. Leigh-Mallory, was allocated to the Tank Corps, flying contact patrols in support of the Tank Corps attacks during the Battle of Amiens, and becoming expert in spotting and destroying German anti-tank guns. The FK.8s and some tanks were equipped with wireless sets, although wireless communications between tanks and aeroplanes remained at a very basic stage for the rest of the war.

On 12 August 1918, Captain Ferdinand West of 8 Squadron was flying a F.K.8 on a contact patrol when he was attacked by seven German fighters. Despite a severe leg wound, West managed to manoeuvre his aircraft so that his observer could drive off the attacking fighters, before making a forced landing behind Allied lines and insisting in reporting the results of the flight. He was awarded the Victoria Cross for this action.

In December 1918, a few weeks after the Armistice with Germany that ended the First World War, the Squadron re-equipped with Sunbeam Arab-engined Bristol F.2 Fighters. It served briefly in Germany as part of the British Army of Occupation, before moving back to the United Kingdom in July 1919 and disbanding on 20 January 1920.

Reformation
8 Squadron reformed at Helwan, near Cairo, Egypt, as a day-bomber squadron equipped with the Airco DH.9A on 18 October 1920. It moved to Basra, Iraq in the Air Policing role, with the security of Iraq the responsibility of the RAF, in February 1921. The squadron was deployed to Kirkuk in July 1922, where it operated against a Kurdish rebellion and Turkish infiltration, and helping to evacuate forces allied to the British from the city of Sulaymaniyah in September 1922. In November–December 1923 the squadron was deployed against Marsh Arabs in the Mesopotamian Marshes.

In February 1927, in response to unrest in Aden, 8 Squadron was deployed to RAF Khormaksar, where it continued in the air policing role. The squadron replaced its elderly DH.9As with new Fairey IIIF light bombers from January 1928. It flew operations against Zaidi in February 1928 and against the Subaihi tribe, who were refusing to pay taxes and revolting, from January to March 1929. Operations against the Subaihi involved destroying crops with incendiary bombs and bombing villages after giving warning so they could be evacuated. This pressure eventually forced the Subaihi to sue for peace, with the rebel chiefs paying fines. More peaceful operation carried out by the squadron included survey flights, casualty evacuation and carrying mail, while the squadron carried out a long-distance return trip from Aden to Cairo and back in 1932.

In April 1935, it re-equipped again with Vickers Vincents, a general purpose aircraft based on the Vickers Vildebeest biplane torpedo bomber replacing the Fairey IIIFs. The squadron started to receive Bristol Blenheim twin-engined monoplane bombers in April 1939, but it retained a flight of Vincents for operations over the rough interior of the Aden Protectorate.

Second World War
On 10 June 1940, Italy declared war on Britain and France. No 8 Squadron flew its first combat missions of the war on 12 June, when nine Blenheims bombed an airfield at Assab in Italian-occupied Eritrea, across the Red Sea from Aden, with 5 Vincents attacking the same airfield that night. On 5 August 1940, Italy invaded British Somaliland, and 8 Squadron's Blenheims flew missions against advancing Italian troop columns. The Italians heavily outnumbered the British and Commonwealth defences, and the port of Berbera was occupied by the Italians on 19 August.

The squadron's long association with the Middle East gave rise to the adoption of the Arabian Khunjah as the unit's badge. The unit continued to be based at RAF Khormaksar in Aden equipped with Bristol Blenheims. Vickers Wellington XIIIs were flown from December 1943 until May 1945.

Post-War (1945–1971)
On 15 May 1945 No. 8 Squadron was reformed by renumbering No. 200 Squadron at RAF Jessore in India. Consolidated Liberator VIs were flown. The squadron again disbanded on 15 November 1945.

The unit was reformed at Khormaksar on 1 September 1946 by renumbering No. 114 Squadron and the role of fighter bomber was adopted, initially with Mosquito FB.6 aircraft. These were replaced by the Hawker Tempest, and the Bristol Brigand. Jet equipment was received in 1953 with the De Havilland Vampire FB.9. Continued updating of equipment brought the De Havilland Venom FB.1 and FB.4 and the Hawker Hunter, flown from 1960 until 1967. The squadron disbanded on 21 December 1971.

Shackletons and Sentries (1972–2021)

The squadron reformed at RAF Kinloss on 1 January 1972 in the Airborne Early Warning (AEW) role using Avro Shackleton AEW.2s. It moved to RAF Lossiemouth on 14 August 1973, where it stayed until 1991 when it moved to RAF Waddington near Lincoln and re-equipped with Boeing E-3 Sentry. The squadron was deployed over the Balkans in the early 1990s; it also saw action over Iraq in 2009 and Afghanistan in 2010 and was then involved in Operation Ellamy in 2011 during the Libyan Civil War.

In early 2015, No. 8 Squadron deployed with two Sentries to RAF Akrotiri, Cyprus, to participate in Operation Shader. 

Two Sentries (ZH101 and ZH103) deployed to RAF Akrotiri in late May/early June 2021 to support Carrier Strike Group 21 as it passed through the Mediterranean Sea. The E-3D's final operational sortie was carried out on 30 July, with ZH103 returning to Waddington on 2 August followed by ZH101 on 4 August. The Sentry AEW1s were officially retired by the RAF on 28 September 2021.

Future 
It was announced in July 2019 that from the mid-2020s the squadron will be the first to operate the Boeing E-7 Wedgetail, the planned replacement for the RAF's E-3D Sentry fleet.

Aircraft operated

Aircraft operated include:

 Royal Aircraft Factory BE.2 (1915–1917)
 Armstrong Whitworth F.K.8 (1917–1918)
 Bristol Fighter (1918–1920)
 Airco DH.9A  (1920–1927)
 Fairey IIIF (1927–1935)
 Vickers Vincent (1935–1942)
 Bristol Blenheim (1939–1943)
 Lockheed Hudson (1943)
 Vickers Wellington (1944–1945)
 Consolidated Liberator (1945)
 de Havilland Mosquito (1946–1961)
 Hawker Tempest (1947–1949)
 Bristol Brigand (1949–1952)
 de Havilland Vampire FB.9 (1952–1955)
 de Havilland Venom FB.1/FB.4 (1955–1960)
 Gloster Meteor FR.9 (1958–1961)
 Hawker Hunter (1960–1971)
 Avro Shackleton AEW.2 (1973–1991)
 Boeing E-3D Sentry AEW1 (1991–2021)

Magic Roundabout and the RAF

8 Squadron's Avro Shackleton airborne early warning aircraft were named after characters from The Magic Roundabout and The Herbs:
 WL741: PC Knapweed
 WL745: Sage
 WL754: Paul
 WL756: Mr Rusty
 WL757: Brian
 WL790: Mr McHenry (later renamed Zebedee) (now in Pima Air and Space Museum, Arizona, USA)
 WL793: Ermintrude
 WL795: Rosalie
 WR960: Dougal (now in the Museum of Science and Industry in Manchester in the UK)
 WR963: Parsley (later Ermintrude II)
 WR965: Dill (later Rosalie II) (sometimes referred to as Dylan) – crashed on Isle of Harris on 30 April 1990, killing all ten on board.

See also
 List of Royal Air Force aircraft squadrons

References

Citations

Bibliography
 Ashworth, Chris. Encyclopedia of Modern Royal Air Force Squadrons. Wellingborough, UK:PSL, 1989. .
 Bruce, J. M. The Aeroplanes of the Royal Flying Corps (Military Wing). London: Putnam, 1982. .
 Fuller, J. F. C. Tanks in the Great War: 1914-1918. New York: E. P. Dutton and Company, 1920.
 Halley, James J. The Squadrons of the Royal Air Force. Tonbridge, Kent, UK: Air-Britain (Historians), 1980. .
 Halley, James, J. The Squadrons of the Royal Air Force & Commonwealth 1918-1988. Air-Britain (Historians) Ltd, 1988. Tonbridge, Kent. .
 Lewis, Peter. Squadron Histories: R.F.C, R.N.A.S and R.A.F., 1912–59. London: Putnam, 1959.
 Rawlings, John D. R. Coastal, Support and Special Squadrons of the RAF and their Aircraft. London: Jane's Publishing Company, 1982. .
 Shores, Christopher. Dust Clouds in the Middle East: The Air War for East Africa, Iraq, Syria, Iran and Madagascar, 1940–42. London: Grub Street, 1996. .
 Thetford, Owen. "By Day and By Night: Fairey IIIF and Gordon in Service". Aeroplane Monthly, Vol 22 No 5, May 1994. pp. 32–38. ISSN 0143-7240.

External links

 Royal Air Force website – 8 Squadron
 8 Squadron Association

Military units and formations established in 1915
008 Squadron
008 Squadron
1915 establishments in the United Kingdom
Military units and formations in Aden in World War II
R